Nobold is a hamlet on the south-western edge of Shrewsbury in Shropshire, England. It is located on the Shrewsbury to Longden road. Nobold boasts Shropshire's oldest natural water well.

Nearby are Meole Brace and Hook-a-Gate villages.

See also
 Edgebold

External links

Hamlets in Shropshire